Aniline (and -ine indicating a derived substance) is an organic compound with the formula . Consisting of a phenyl group attached to an amino group, aniline is the simplest aromatic amine. It is an industrially significant commodity chemical, as well as a versatile starting material for fine chemical synthesis.  Its main use is in the manufacture of precursors to polyurethane, dyes, and other industrial chemicals. Like most volatile amines, it has the odor of rotten fish. It ignites readily, burning with a smoky flame characteristic of aromatic compounds. It is toxic to humans.

Relative to benzene, it is electron-rich. It thus participates more rapidly in electrophilic aromatic substitution reactions. Likewise, it is also prone to oxidation:  while freshly purified aniline is an almost colorless oil, exposure to air results in gradual darkening to yellow or red, due to the formation of strongly colored, oxidized impurities. Aniline can be diazotized to give a diazonium salt, which can then undergo various nucleophilic substitution reactions.

Like other amines, aniline is both a base (pKaH = 4.6) and a nucleophile, although less so than structurally similar aliphatic amines.

Because an early source of the benzene from which they are derived was coal tar, aniline dyes are also called coal tar dyes.

Structure

Aryl-N distances
In aniline, the C−N bond length is 1.41 Å, compared to 1.47 Å for cyclohexylamine, indicating partial π-bonding between N and C. The C(aryl)-NH2 distance in anilines is highly sensitive to substituent effects.  This distance is 1.34 Å in 2,4,6-trinitroaniline vs 1.44 Å in 3-methylaniline.

Pyramidalization
The amine in anilines is a slightly pyramidalized molecule, with hybridization of the nitrogen somewhere between sp3 and sp2.  The nitrogen is described as having high p character.  The amino group in aniline is flatter (i.e., it is a "shallower pyramid") than that in an aliphatic amine, owing to conjugation of the lone pair with the aryl substituent.  The observed geometry reflects a compromise between two competing factors: 1) stabilization of the N lone pair in an orbital with significant s character favors pyramidalization (orbitals with s character are lower in energy), while 2) delocalization of the N lone pair into the aryl ring favors planarity (a lone pair in a pure p orbital gives the best overlap with the orbitals of the benzene ring π system).

Consistent with these factors, substituted anilines with electron donating groups are more pyramidalized, while those with electron withdrawing groups are more planar.  In the parent aniline, the lone pair is approximately 12% s character, corresponding to sp7.3 hybridization.  (For comparison, alkylamines generally have lone pairs in orbitals that are close to sp3.)

The pyramidalization angle between the C–N bond and the bisector of the H–N–H angle is 142.5°. For comparison, in more strongly pyramidal methylamine, this value is ~125°, while that of formamide has an angle of 180°.

Production
Industrial aniline production involves two steps. First, benzene is nitrated with a concentrated mixture of nitric acid and sulfuric acid at 50 to 60 °C to yield nitrobenzene. The nitrobenzene is then hydrogenated (typically at 200–300 °C) in the presence of metal catalysts:

The reduction of nitrobenzene to aniline was first performed by Nikolay Zinin in 1842, using inorganic sulfide as a reductant (Zinin reaction). The reduction of nitrobenzene to aniline was also performed as part of reductions by Antoine Béchamp in 1854, using iron as the reductant (Bechamp reduction).

Aniline can alternatively be prepared from ammonia and phenol derived from the cumene process.

In commerce, three brands of aniline are distinguished: aniline oil for blue, which is pure aniline; aniline oil for red, a mixture of equimolecular quantities of aniline and ortho- and para-toluidines; and aniline oil for safranine, which contains aniline and ortho-toluidine and is obtained from the distillate (échappés) of the fuchsine fusion.

Related aniline derivatives
Many analogues of aniline are known where the phenyl group is further substituted. These include toluidines, xylidines, chloroanilines, aminobenzoic acids, nitroanilines, and many others. They often are prepared by nitration of the substituted aromatic compounds followed by reduction. For example, this approach is used to convert toluene into toluidines and chlorobenzene into 4-chloroaniline. Alternatively, using Buchwald-Hartwig coupling or Ullmann reaction approaches, aryl halides can be aminated with aqueous or gaseous ammonia.

Reactions
The chemistry of aniline is rich because the compound has been cheaply available for many years. Below are some classes of its reactions.

Oxidation

The oxidation of aniline has been heavily investigated, and can result in reactions localized at nitrogen or more commonly results in the formation of new C-N bonds. In alkaline solution, azobenzene results, whereas arsenic acid produces the violet-coloring matter violaniline. Chromic acid converts it into quinone, whereas chlorates, in the presence of certain metallic salts (especially of vanadium), give aniline black. Hydrochloric acid and potassium chlorate give chloranil. Potassium permanganate in neutral solution oxidizes it to nitrobenzene; in alkaline solution to azobenzene, ammonia, and oxalic acid; in acid solution to aniline black. Hypochlorous acid gives 4-aminophenol and para-amino diphenylamine. Oxidation with persulfate affords a variety of polyanilines. These polymers exhibit rich redox and acid-base properties.

Electrophilic reactions at ortho- and para- positions
Like phenols, aniline derivatives are highly susceptible to electrophilic substitution reactions. Its high reactivity reflects that it is an enamine, which enhances the electron-donating ability of the ring. For example, reaction of aniline with sulfuric acid at 180 °C produces sulfanilic acid, .

If bromine water is added to aniline, the bromine water is decolourised and a white precipitate of 2,4,6-tribromoaniline is formed. To generate the mono-substituted product, a protection with acetyl chloride is required:

The reaction to form 4-bromoaniline is to protect the amine with acetyl chloride, then hydrolyse back to reform aniline.

The largest scale industrial reaction of aniline involves its alkylation with formaldehyde. An idealized equation is shown:

2 C6H5NH2 + CH2O -> CH2(C6H4NH2)2 + H2O
The resulting diamine is the precursor to 4,4'-MDI and related diisocyanates.

Reactions at nitrogen

Basicity
Aniline is a weak base. Aromatic amines such as aniline are, in general, much weaker bases than aliphatic amines. Aniline reacts with strong acids to form the anilinium (or phenylammonium) ion.

Traditionally, the weak basicity of aniline is attributed to a combination of inductive effect from the more electronegative sp2 carbon and resonance effects, as the lone pair on the nitrogen is partially delocalized into the pi system of the benzene ring. (see the picture below):

Missing in such an analysis is consideration of solvation. Aniline is, for example, more basic than ammonia in the gas phase, but ten thousand times less so in aqueous solution.

Acylation

Aniline reacts with acyl chlorides such as acetyl chloride to give amides. The amides formed from aniline are sometimes called anilides, for example  is acetanilide. At high temperatures aniline and carboxylic acids react to give the anilides.

N-Alkylation
N-Methylation of aniline with methanol at elevated temperatures over acid catalysts gives N-methylaniline and N,N-dimethylaniline:
C6H5NH2 + 2 CH3OH -> C6H5N(CH3)2 + 2H2O
N-Methylaniline and N,N-dimethylaniline are colorless liquids with boiling points of 193–195 °C and 192 °C, respectively. These derivatives are of importance in the color industry.

Carbon disulfide derivatives
Boiled with carbon disulfide, it gives sulfocarbanilide (diphenylthiourea), which may be decomposed into phenyl isothiocyanate, and triphenyl guanidine.

Diazotization
Aniline and its ring-substituted derivatives react with nitrous acid to form diazonium salts. Through these intermediates, the amine group can be  converted to a hydroxyl, nitrile, or halide group (where X is a halogen) via Sandmeyer reactions.
The reaction of converting primary aromatic amine into diazonium salt is called diazotisation.
In this reaction primary aromatic amine reacts with sodium nitrile and with 2 moles of HCl which is known as Ice cold mixture because the temperature use to be 0.5 °C and it forms benzene diazonium salt as major product and water and sodium chloride.

Other reactions
It reacts with nitrobenzene to produce phenazine in the Wohl-Aue reaction. Hydrogenation gives cyclohexylamine.

Being a standard reagent in laboratories, aniline is used for many niche reactions. Its acetate is used in the aniline acetate test for carbohydrates, identifying pentoses by conversion to furfural. It is used to stain neural RNA blue in the Nissl stain.

Uses
Aniline is predominantly used for the preparation of methylenedianiline and related compounds by condensation with formaldehyde. The diamines are condensed with phosgene to give methylene diphenyl diisocyanate, a precursor to urethane polymers.

Other uses include rubber processing chemicals (9%), herbicides (2%), and dyes and pigments (2%). As additives to rubber, aniline derivatives such as phenylenediamines and diphenylamine, are antioxidants. Illustrative of the drugs prepared from aniline is paracetamol (acetaminophen, Tylenol). The principal use of aniline in the dye industry is as a precursor to indigo, the blue of blue jeans.

History
Aniline was first isolated in 1826 by Otto Unverdorben by destructive distillation of indigo. He called it Crystallin. In 1834, Friedlieb Runge isolated a substance from coal tar that turned a beautiful blue color when treated with chloride of lime. He named it kyanol or cyanol. In 1840, Carl Julius Fritzsche (1808–1871) treated indigo with caustic potash and obtained an oil that he named aniline, after an indigo-yielding plant, anil (Indigofera suffruticosa). In 1842, Nikolay Nikolaevich Zinin reduced nitrobenzene and obtained a base that he named benzidam. In 1843, August Wilhelm von Hofmann showed that these were all the same substance, known thereafter as phenylamine or aniline.

Synthetic dye industry
In 1856, while trying to synthesise quinine, von Hofmann's student William Henry Perkin discovered mauveine and went into industry producing the first commercial synthetic dye. Other aniline dyes followed, such as fuchsin, safranin, and induline. At the time of mauveine's discovery, aniline was expensive. Soon thereafter, applying a method reported in 1854 by Antoine Béchamp, it was prepared "by the ton". The Béchamp reduction enabled the evolution of a massive dye industry in Germany. Today, the name of BASF, originally Badische Anilin- und Soda-Fabrik (English: Baden Aniline and Soda Factory), now the largest chemical supplier, echoes the legacy of the synthetic dye industry, built via aniline dyes and extended via the related azo dyes. The first azo dye was aniline yellow.

Developments in medicine
In the late 19th century, derivatives of aniline such as acetanilide and phenacetin emerged as analgesic drugs, with their cardiac-suppressive side effects often countered with caffeine. During the first decade of the 20th century, while trying to modify synthetic dyes to treat African sleeping sickness, Paul Ehrlich – who had coined the term chemotherapy for his magic bullet approach to medicine – failed and switched to modifying Béchamp's atoxyl, the first organic arsenical drug, and serendipitously obtained a treatment for syphilis – salvarsan – the first successful chemotherapy agent. Salvarsan's targeted microorganism, not yet recognized as a bacterium, was still thought to be a parasite, and medical bacteriologists, believing that bacteria were not susceptible to the chemotherapeutic approach, overlooked Alexander Fleming's report in 1928 on the effects of penicillin.

In 1932, Bayer sought medical applications of its dyes. Gerhard Domagk identified as an antibacterial a red azo dye, introduced in 1935 as the first antibacterial drug, prontosil, soon found at Pasteur Institute to be a prodrug degraded in vivo into sulfanilamide – a colorless intermediate for many, highly colorfast azo dyes – already with an expired patent, synthesized in 1908 in Vienna by the researcher Paul Gelmo for his doctoral research. By the 1940s, over 500 related sulfa drugs were produced. Medications in high demand during World War II (1939–45), these first miracle drugs, chemotherapy of wide effectiveness, propelled the American pharmaceutics industry. In 1939, at Oxford University, seeking an alternative to sulfa drugs, Howard Florey developed Fleming's penicillin into the first systemic antibiotic drug, penicillin G. (Gramicidin, developed by René Dubos at Rockefeller Institute in 1939, was the first antibiotic, yet its toxicity restricted it to topical use.) After World War II, Cornelius P. Rhoads introduced the chemotherapeutic approach to cancer treatment.

Rocket fuel
Some early American rockets, such as the Aerobee and WAC Corporal, used a mixture of aniline and furfuryl alcohol as a fuel, with nitric acid as an oxidizer. The combination is hypergolic, igniting on contact between fuel and oxidizer. It is also dense, and can be stored for extended periods. Aniline was later replaced by hydrazine.

Toxicology and testing
Aniline is toxic by inhalation of the vapour, ingestion, or percutaneous absorption. The IARC lists it in Group 3 (not classifiable as to its carcinogenicity to humans) due to the limited and contradictory data available. The early manufacture of aniline resulted in increased incidents of bladder cancer, but these effects are now attributed to naphthylamines, not anilines.

Aniline has been implicated as one possible cause of forest dieback.

Many methods exist for the detection of aniline.

Oxidative DNA damage

Exposure of rats to aniline can elicit a response that is toxic to the spleen, including a tumorigenic response.  Rats exposed to aniline in drinking water, showed a significant increase in oxidative DNA damage to the spleen, detected as a 2.8-fold increase in 8-hydroxy-2’-deoxyguanosine (8-OHdG) in their DNA.  Although the base excision repair pathway was also activated, its activity was not sufficient to prevent the accumulation of 8-OHdG.  The accumulation of oxidative DNA damages in the spleen following exposure to aniline may increase mutagenic events that underlie tumorigenesis.

Notes

References

External links

International Chemical Safety Card 0011
CDC - NIOSH Pocket Guide to Chemical Hazrds
Aniline electropolymerisation

 
Dyes
German inventions
Hazardous air pollutants
IARC Group 3 carcinogens
Phenyl compounds